KRTU-FM (91.7 MHz) is a radio station broadcasting a mainstream Jazz format. Licensed in San Antonio, Texas, United States, the station serves the San Antonio area.  The station is owned by Trinity University. Between 10 p.m. and 5 a.m., the station format changes from mainstream jazz to alternative and indie rock.

KRTU 91.7 is a resource of the Department of Communication that supports the academic curriculum while demonstrating Trinity University’s leadership in education and the arts.

About 

Founded in 1976, KRTU is a non-commercial educational, nonprofit radio station under Trinity's 501(c)(3). KRTU programs a 17-hour/day mainstream jazz format, with alternative/indie rock overnight. The broadcast reaches throughout the San Antonio metropolitan area and into adjoining townships. KRTU is available in HD terrestrially and can be streamed worldwide on the Internet.

The station employs a full-time staff of six, while students and community volunteers support the operations throughout the year. As a public service, KRTU "Jazz for San Antonio" plays an active role in supporting local arts and artists.

In 2003, the KRTU staff included Aaron Prado-Music Director and Chief Announcer, Chris Helfrich-Director of Development, and Robin Cunningham-Operations Manager.

Mission 

KRTU 91.7, a non-profit, listener supported radio station, is a resource of the Department of Communication that supports the academic curriculum while demonstrating Trinity University’s leadership in education and the arts.

See also
 List of jazz radio stations in the United States

References

External links
 On-air schedule.
 KRTU Official Website

RTU-FM
Jazz radio stations in the United States
Radio stations established in 1976
1976 establishments in Texas